Jalamah  is the traditional dish of Asir, native to Bareg and Qunfudhah. Jalamah is made from Lamb (meat), and a mixture of Arabic Spices. The meat used is usually a young and small sized lamb to enhance the taste further.

See also

 List of lamb dishes

References

Saudi Arabian cuisine
Yemeni cuisine
Lamb dishes

https://www.tasteatlas.com/jalamah